Louis Yvert (born 24 June 1866 in Paris and died 17 April 1950 in Amiens) was the co-founder of French philatelic publisher Yvert et Tellier with printer Théodule Tellier, from the family-printing company established in the 1830s by his grandfather, legitimist journalist Eugène Yvert.

Biography 
Louis Yvert was the son of lawyer Henry Yvert and Mademoiselle de Taisy, first singer at the Paris Opera. He was four years old when his parents moved to Amiens, where his father bought Eugène Yvert's company. Henry founded a new legitimist paper, L'Écho de la Somme. After his baccalauréats es-literature and es-sciences, he served voluntarily in the army. Then, he began his Law studies in Paris, where he lived like a dandy.

His father died in 1885, but his mother decided that Louis must finished his studies before becoming the new director of the Yvert company. She associated her family to the chief-printer Théodule Tellier. When Louis came back in Amiens in 1889, he wrote for L'Écho de la Somme. In 1891, the same year he married, he became the director of the paper. While he disliked the political, legimist and conservative way of thinking of the paper and its readers, L'Écho de la Somme remained the main beneficial source of the Yvert et Tellier printing company.

The discovery of stamp collecting changed everything. Thank to Théodule Tellier, Louis Yvert became a collector, interested himself in L'Écho de la timbrologie, a philatelic paper Tellier bought in 1890. He saw the interest of collectors for printed stamp albums and exhaustive catalogs.

1895, he ceased to write in L'Écho de la Somme and directed all his efforts to philatelic matters. Tellier and Yvert's main idea had been a catalog whose numeration would be permanent, unlike many catalogs of that time who changed their numeration and criteria each year. The first edition of the Catalogue prix-courant de timbres-poste par Yvert et Tellier was published in November 1896 for a price of two francs. Eight thousands catalogs were printed, 576 pages long and listing five thousands postage stamps. Success was quick and the catalog became annual.

With the prosperity of the Yvert et Tellier company, Louis Yvert travelled in all Western Europe while Tellier surveyed the firm's day-to-day operations. During a stay in Paris in 1900, he met Genevois stamp dealer Théodore Champion. This expert associated himself with Yvert and Tellier : until his death in 1954, Champion prepared the cotations published in the catalogue Yvert et Tellier - Champion.

1 April 1913, Tellier retired and sold his parts to Louis Yvert, but, the latter friendly maintained the name of the chief-printer in the catalog title.

With the first half of the 20th century, Yvert et Tellier became the philatelic reference in France. Progressively, during the interwar period, Louis prepared his succession. He put his two sons and his son-in-law at key posts of the company :
 elder Henri Yvert quietly run the printer plant,
 younger Pierre Yvert lively directed L'Écho de la timbrologie and travelled like his father for philatelic relationships,
 and Jean Gervais abandoned a doctor career to marry Louis' daughter, Jeanne. In exchange, the father made him responsible of the publishing house (books, albums, catalogs).

Louis Yvert died in Amiens in 1950.

Sources 
 The book was published for the centenary of the company.

French philatelists
1866 births
1950 deaths